The Kravtsovskoye oilfield is located within block D-6 in the coastal waters of the Baltic Sea, about  west of Russia's Kaliningrad Oblast. The deposit was opened in 1983 and extraction began in 2004. The extraction operation is conducted by Lukoil. Recoverable oil in the field is estimated at 9.1 million tonnes.

The field is developed with two platforms which were installed by using a Stanislav Yudin crane vessel.  The firms involved in the field's infrastructure construction included Corall Central Design Bureau, Kaliningradmorneft, Krein-Shelf, Germanischer Lloyd, Gosgortekhnadzor, Siemens, and HRI Oilfield, L.P.  Produced oil and associated gas is transported by a  underwater pipeline to the Romanovo oil-gathering unit.  Crude oil is exported through the Izhevsky oil terminal.

Due to its proximity to the Curonian Spit, a UNESCO World Heritage site lying within both Lithuania and the Oblast, concerns over the environmental impact of a spill at the site have been raised. During the 2000s the two states agreed to a joint environmental impact assessment of the D-6 project, including plans for oil spill mitigation.  The assessment and mitigation project had not been completed as of 2010.

References

Oil fields of Russia
Lukoil oil and gas fields
Baltic Sea
Lithuania–Russia relations